GAC Mitsubishi Motors Co., Ltd. is an automobile manufacturing company headquartered in Changsha, China.

History
The company was founded on September 25, 2012. The GAC Group holds 50%, Mitsubishi Motors 30% and Mitsubishi Corporation 20%. Other sources give 50%, 33% and 17%.

In the same year the production of automobiles began. The brand name is Mitsubishi. The plant had a production capacity of 100,000 vehicles in 2016. Engines have also been manufactured since 2018.

Vehicles
Mitsubishi ASX, Outlander and Pajero were recorded for 2016. A source from 2020 confirms these three models and also names the Eclipse Cross. According to this source, the Pajero was produced until 2015, the ASX since 2013, the Outlander since 2016, while no period is given for the Eclipse Cross.

The Mitsubishi Airtrek was produced by GAC Mitsubishi starting from the 2022 model year.

Eupheme
Eupheme is the brand of the GAC Mitsubishi joint venture. The Eupheme PHEV and Eupheme EV are the two products sold and manufactured by GAC Mitsubishi under the brand.

Sales figures
56,700 vehicles were built in 2016.

References

External links
GAC Mitsubishi Official website

Car manufacturers of China
Manufacturing companies based in Hunan
Vehicle manufacturing companies established in 2012
Mitsubishi Motors subsidiaries
GAC Group joint ventures
Chinese-foreign joint-venture companies
Companies based in Changsha